Marcos Silva is a Brazilian Paralympic footballer.

Biography
Silva is a Paralympic footballer who won Bronze medal for being a participant at the 2000 Summer Paralympics in Sydney, Australia and was awarded silver medal for 2004 Summer Paralympics in Athens, Greece. In 2008 Summer Paralympics he scored a goal for his team in Beijing, China where his country played against the Netherlands on September 8, 2008. He also participated at BT Paralympic World Cup Wheelchair Basketball event at the Manchester Regional Arena on May 24, 2011, in Manchester, England.

References

External links
 

20th-century births
Year of birth missing (living people)
Living people
Paralympic 7-a-side football players of Brazil
Paralympic silver medalists for Brazil
Paralympic bronze medalists for Brazil
Paralympic medalists in football 7-a-side
7-a-side footballers at the 2000 Summer Paralympics
7-a-side footballers at the 2004 Summer Paralympics
7-a-side footballers at the 2008 Summer Paralympics
Medalists at the 2000 Summer Paralympics
Medalists at the 2004 Summer Paralympics
Place of birth missing (living people)
21st-century Brazilian people